Emenike Uchenna Mbachu (born 21 May 1989 in Lagos), also known as Epeleje, is a Nigerian footballer who plays as a winger for Pallo-Iirot.

In the middle of the season in 2011, he came from Nigeria to join PS Kemi in the Ykkönen. He changed clubs after the first season as PS Kemi was relegated and continued to play in Ykkönen another year. During his shortened first season in Finland he played 9 matches and scored 6 goals.

At RoPS, Emenike joined fellow Nigerians, central defenders Nduka Alison and Faith Friday Obilor. During the 2012 season, Emenike scored 6 goals, while RoPS came first in the league, gaining promotion to the Veikkausliiga.

Honours
Ykkönen Champion: 2012

References

External links

Nigerian footballers
Nigerian expatriate footballers
Rovaniemen Palloseura players
Veikkausliiga players
Association football defenders
1989 births
Living people
Sportspeople from Lagos
FC Santa Claus players
FC Ilves players
FC Haka players